is a Japanese voice actor affiliated with Ken Production. He played Bear in .hack//Sign and Fei-Wang Reed in Tsubasa: Reservoir Chronicle.

Biography
He became interested with voice acting, while studying university, when at one point he was assigned to be a chairman of a radio drama production at the festival.

Filmography

Television animation
Mobile Suit Victory Gundam (1993) – Duker Iq
Mobile Fighter G Gundam (1994) – Gentle Chapman
Mobile Suit Gundam Wing (1995) – Rashid Kurama
Virtua Fighter (1995) as Lee Coleman
After War Gundam X (1996) – Nomoa Long
Cowboy Bebop (1998) – Morgan
Gear Fighter Dendoh (2002) – Altair the Black Knight
Kasumin (2001) – Kirinobito
.hack//Sign (2002) – Bear
Witchblade (2006) – Masaya Wado
Fate/stay night (2006) – Sōichirō Kuzuki
Demonbane (2006) – Ness
Baccano! (2007) – Senator Manfred Beriam
Idolmaster: Xenoglossia (2007) – Joseph Shingetsu

Unknown date 
.hack//Roots (????) – Taihaku
Argento Soma (????) – Colonel Kilgore
Atashin'chi (????) – Karasawa-sensei (First)
Bleach (????) – Jiroubou Ikkanzaka, Kagine-sensei
B'TX (????) – Karas
Corrector Yui (????) – Virus
Crayon Shin-chan (????) – Billy Tachibana, Ohta
Detective Conan (????) – Cedar Forest Governmental Person) Tomidokoro (episode 86)
Elemental Gelade (????) – Beazon
Full Metal Panic! (????) – Bryant
Grappler Baki (????) – Kosho Shinogi
Great Teacher Onizuka (????) – Hajime Fukuroda
Grenadier ~The Smiling Senshi~ (????) – The Jester/Kaizan Doshi
Heat Guy J (????) – Misha
Initial D Fourth Stage (????) – Tomoyuki Tachi
Irresponsible Captain Tylor (????) – Cryburn
Kiteretsu Daihyakka (????) – Saigō Takamori
Konjiki no Gash Bell!! (????) – Toyama-sensei
Kotencotenco (????) – The Baron
Mahōjin Guru Guru (????) – Captain
Naruto (????) – Shiin
Nintama Rantarou (????) – Tamasaburō, Kuen Castella
Outlaw Star (????) – Ron MacDougall
Rurouni Kenshin (????) – Shikijō
Saiunkoku Monogatari (????) – Kijin Kou
Shaman King (????) – Karim
Shin Hakkenden (????) – Kajiya Yagami
Shōnen Onmyōji (????) – Byakko
Slayers Next (????) – Halcyform
Legend of Heavenly Sphere Shurato (????) – Kūya, the King Dappa
Tsubasa Chronicle (????) – Fei Wong Reed
Yu-Gi-Oh! Duel Monsters GX (????) – Ikaku Tachibana
Brave Command Dagwon (????) – Demos
The Secret of Twilight Gemini (????) – Priest
Rockman EXE series (Doctor Regal, Laserman, Kyuuma Hoshida)
Sakigake!! Otokojuku (????) – Kiyomi Tsubakiyama

OVA
Armor Hunter Mellowlink (????) – Sukarupesu
Mobile Suit Gundam Wing: Endless Waltz (1997) – Rashid Kurama
Giant Robo (????) – Blood Furen
Urotsukidoji (????) – D-9
M.D. Geist (????) – Geist) (Director's Cut version)
M.D. Geist II: Death Force (????) – Geist
Mazinkaiser: Shitou! Ankoku Daishogun (????) – Dante
Phantom - The Animation (????) – Scythe Master
The Silent Service (1995) – Harold D. Baker

Theatrical animation
Mobile Suit Gundam Wing: Endless Waltz Special Edition (1998) – Rashid Kurama
Gundress (1999) – Seremu
Rockman EXE: The Program of Light and Darkness (2005) – Doctor Regal, Nebula Grey
Fate/stay night Unlimited Blade Works (2010) – Sōichirō Kuzuki

Video games
Crash Bandicoot 2: Cortex Strikes Back (1997) – Doctor N. Gin
Crash Bandicoot: Warped (1998) – Doctor N. Gin
Ehrgeiz (1998) – Vincent Valentine
Crash Team Racing (1999) – Doctor N. Gin
Valkyrie Profile (1999) – Belinas, Wraith
Crash Bandicoot: The Wrath of Cortex (2001) – Doctor N. Gin
Crash Nitro Kart (2003) – Doctor N. Gin
Samurai Shodown V Special (2004) – Zankuro Minazuki
Super Robot Wars MX (2004) – Altair
Suikoden IV (2004) – Clay
Crash Twinsanity (2004) – Doctor N. Gin
Elemental Gelade: Matoe, Suifū no Tsurugi (2005) – Beazon
Shadow of the Colossus (2005) – Dormin[male voice]
Xenosaga Episode III: Also sprach Zarathustra (2006) – Suou Uzuki

Drama CDs
Kao no Nai Otoko (xxxx) (Hisashi Kiriyuu)
Manatsu no Higaisha 1 & 2 (xxxx) (Yuuichi Ookura)
Pinky Wolf (xxxx) (Masakazu Kuroki)
Stanley Hawk no Jikenbo ~AMBIVALENCE . Katto~ (xxxx) (Stanley)

Dubbing roles

Live-action
Hugo Weaving
The Matrix – Agent Smith
The Matrix Reloaded – Agent Smith
The Matrix Revolutions – Agent Smith
The 13th Warrior – Edgtho (Daniel Southern)
2 Fast 2 Furious (2006 TV Asahi edition) – Carter Verone (Cole Hauser)
Alarm für Cobra 11 – Die Autobahnpolizei – André Fux (Mark Keller)
Alive – Carlitos Páez (Bruce Ramsay)
Armageddon (2002 Fuji TV edition) – Tucker (Anthony Guidera)
Babylon 5 – Jeffrey Sinclair (Michael O'Hare)
Big Trouble – Eddie Leadbetter (Johnny Knoxville)
Casino Royale – Le Chiffre (Mads Mikkelsen)
D-Tox – Noah (Robert Patrick)
Deep Rising – Mamooli (Cliff Curtis)
Deep Rising (2000 TV Asahi edition) – T-Ray Jones (Trevor Goddard)
Demon Knight – Roach (Thomas Haden Church)
Deuce Bigalow: Male Gigolo – Detective Charles Fowler (William Forsythe)
Die Hard with a Vengeance – Rolf (Robert Sedgwick)
Die Hard with a Vengeance (TV edition) – Gunther (Timothy Adams)
End of Days – Monk (Mo Gallini)
The Fast and the Furious – Johnny Tran (Rick Yune)
The Firm – Ray McDeere (David Strathairn)
High Incident – Sergeant Jim Marsh (David Keith)
The Messenger: The Story of Joan of Arc – Gilles de Rais (Vincent Cassel)
Mission: Impossible (1999 Fuji TV/2003 TV Asahi editions) – Max's Companion (Andreas Wisniewski)
Natural Born Killers – Mickey Knox (Woody Harrelson)
Platoon (2003 TV Tokyo edition) – Doc (Paul Sanchez)
RoboCop – Dick Jones (Ronny Cox)
The Rock (2000 TV Asahi edition) – Seal Reigert (Marshall Teague)
Shaolin Soccer – Whirlwind Leg (Mok Mei Lam)
She-Wolf of London – Pitak (Pete Lee-Wilson)
Space Jam – Larry Bird
Tokyo Raiders – Detective Lam Kwai-yan (Tony Leung Chiu-wai)
Tomorrow Never Dies (2002 TV Asahi edition) – Stamper (Götz Otto)
True Romance – Drexl Spivey (Gary Oldman)
Twin Peaks – Tommy "Hawk" Hill (Michael Horse)
Ultraman: Towards the Future - Ryugulo
The Untouchables – Frank Nitti (Billy Drago)

Animation
The Batman – James Gordon (first voice)
Hello Kitty's Furry Tale Theater – Grinder
Codename: Kids Next Door – Mr. Fizz
Justice League – Mongul
Looney Tunes – Marvin the Martian

Other
Peter Pan's Flight (Giant Octopus)

References

 Katoh, Hidekazu et al. "Tsubasa - Reservoir Chronicle". (May 2007) Newtype USA. pp. 26–33.

External links
Kazuhiro Nakata at Ken Production (Japanese)
 
Kazuhiro Nakata at Ryu's Seiyuu Infos
Kazuhiro Nakata at Foreign Drama Database (Japanese)

1958 births
Japanese male video game actors
Japanese male voice actors
Living people
Male voice actors from Nagasaki Prefecture
20th-century Japanese male actors
21st-century Japanese male actors
Ken Production voice actors